Thomas Wilkins may refer to:

 Thomas Wilkins (antiquarian) (1625/26–1699), Welsh cleric and antiquarian who collected Welsh manuscripts
 Thomas Wilkins (conductor) (born c. 1956), American orchestra conductor
 Thomas Russell Wilkins (1891–1940), Canadian physicist

See also
 Tom Wilkens (born 1975), American swimmer
 Thomas Wilkinson (disambiguation)